Iliad Glacier is a glacier flowing northeast from the central highlands of Anvers Island between the Achaean Range and the Trojan Range into Lapeyrere Bay, in the Palmer Archipelago, Antarctica. It was surveyed in 1955 by the Falkland Islands Dependencies Survey and named by the UK Antarctic Place-Names Committee for Homer's Iliad.

See also
 List of glaciers in the Antarctic
 Glaciology

References

Glaciers of the Palmer Archipelago
Geography of Anvers Island